Sigma Alpha Delta originally began in 1932 with Sigma Alpha, the first junior honor society at Baruch College. The Delta chapter for evening students was created in 1959. Both Sigma Alpha and its Delta chapter have been come to be collectively known as Sigma Alpha Delta Honor Society.

Mission of the Society
Since its inception, Sigma Alpha Delta's mission has been two-fold, one complementing the other.  Its first purpose is Scholarship, that is, to distinguish students who excel academically. Baruch College's best students are brought together through the society where they can socialize and form lasting friendships.  The society's second and more important purpose is Service.  Its members use their acumen, combined with good character, to help other Baruch students in whatever way possible and to better their environment. The combination of these two functions has made Sigma Alpha over the years more integral to the infrastructure of Baruch College than any other society and unique in its mission.

Sigma Alpha's constitution (quoted taken from the Lexicon of 1959) stated:
“The purposes of the society are to develop, coordinate and improve the co-curricular life in the College, to foster closer relationships between faculty and students, and to instill in its members a spirit and idealism which will inspire them to lead their fellow students in working for the enhancement of the college.”

History
Sigma Alpha Honor Society was born in 1932 as an elite honor society.  At the time, the college was called “The School of Business and Civic Administration” until 1953 when it was renamed to Baruch College. The college was part of the City College of New York (CCNY) which had two branches, one uptown and one downtown. The “downtown campus” was located in the landmark 18 Story building on the corner of 23rd St and Lexington Ave, New York City, which now is a part of Baruch. This downtown campus was founded in 1919 and, in turn, replaced the previous name of “The Free Academy” that was founded in 1847 which was the first free public institution of higher education in the nation.

Membership Selection
There are four ranks of membership within the Society, with the following requirements:

• Registered – Must be an undergraduate student of the College, must have and completed a number of at least 30 academic credits if entered the College as a freshman, or a minimum of 18 credits if entered the College as a transfer student, must have and maintain an average GPA not below 3.50 and must register as a member on the society's website.

• Active – Must be a Registered Member, must either maintain a minimum of 35 activity credits or pay the Membership Contribution for each academic year, must pledge the Oath of Membership upon receiving the Certificate of Induction. Only Active members can be inducted in the Society.

• Former – Must be a former active member who can no longer maintain the minimum required number of activity credits per semester or pay the membership contribution, but who is not yet Alumni.

• Alumni – Must have been active for at least one academic year and upon graduation must request his/her status to be upgraded to Alumni

Notable members

Traditional Members
 Abraham Briloff - Professor of Accounting; Owner, AJ & LA Briloff, CPAs   
 Stanley Kaplan - Founder of Kaplan, Inc.
 Christofer Garner

Honorary Members
Bernard Baruch - Financier, statesman, and presidential adviser
Felix Frankfurter - Associate Justice of the United States Supreme Court
Dr. Jonas Edward Salk - Developer of the first polio vaccine

References

External links

Honor societies
Student organizations established in 1932
1932 establishments in New York (state)